Federico Raimo (born 13 November 1986 in Aosta) is an Italian snowboarder. He placed 22nd in the men's snowboard cross event at the 2010 Winter Olympics.

References

1986 births
Living people
Italian male snowboarders
Olympic snowboarders of Italy
Snowboarders at the 2010 Winter Olympics
Universiade bronze medalists for Italy
Universiade medalists in snowboarding
Competitors at the 2011 Winter Universiade
People from Aosta
21st-century Italian people